Ape Cognition and Conservation Initiative is a sanctuary and scientific research facility in Des Moines, Iowa. It is dedicated to understanding the origins and future of culture, language, tools and intelligence. The facility was announced in 2002 and received its first ape residents in 2004, and is currently home to a colony of seven bonobos involved in non-invasive interdisciplinary studies of their cognitive and communicative capabilities.

Facility 
Ape Cognition and Conservation Initiative is situated on 230 acres and houses a family of seven bonobos: Kanzi, Elikya, Maisha, Nyota, Teco, Clara, and Mali.  Three of the bonobos learned important elements of human culture during their crucial first year of life.  As a youngster, Kanzi acquired language competency by simply watching humans attempt to teach language to Matata, the wild-caught grandmother of the family.  Nyota is the first ape reared both by humans and a language-competent ape mother. The youngest, Teco, provides a unique look into the epigenetic effects of language acquisition.  All three of these bonobos communicate with humans using a collection of over 400 "lexigram" symbols printed on paper or appearing on computer touch screens.

It has been repeatedly claimed that these bonobos can think, make plans and understand simple spoken English. Kanzi has been filmed making music, building a fire, and crafting simple stone tools.  More than 400 scientific papers and many books document the near-human capabilities of the bonobos, and films portraying their achievements have been broadcast worldwide.  Television coverage includes features with Oprah, Anderson Cooper, 60 Minutes (in Australia), BBC, Paul McCartney and Peter Gabriel.

References

External links 
 Official site

 
Bonobos
Primate sanctuaries
Primate research centers
Buildings and structures in Des Moines, Iowa
Education in Des Moines, Iowa
Museums in Des Moines, Iowa
Non-profit organizations based in Iowa
Environmental organizations established in 2004
Research institutes established in 2004
2004 establishments in Iowa